Cressingham may refer to:
Places
Great Cressingham, Norfolk, England
Little Cressingham, Norfolk, England
People
Hugh de Cressingham, 13th century historical figure